Nikola Mijailović (born 15 February 1982) is a Serbian former footballer.

Club career

Amkar Perm
In 2011 Mijailović joined FC Amkar Perm, where coach Rashid Rakhimov frequently played him as defensive midfielder. When Miodrag Božović became Amkar's new coach, Mijailović moved to the left-back position. Mijailović played a total of 53 league games, in which he scored a total of two goals for Amkar.

Return to Red Star Belgrade
After five years of playing professional football in Poland and Russia, before which Mijailović played for Red Star, Red Star Belgrade was looking to bring back veterans from across borders. On 26 June 2013 Mijailović signed for Red Star Belgrade on a one-year contract. In 2015, he got suspended because of anonymous mails to Red Star Belgrade, in every letter first pasus formed this name – "Nikola Džoni" which is his nickname.

International career
He was part of the Serbia and Montenegro under-21 team which were runners-up at the 2004 UEFA European Under-21 Championship. Mijalović plays as captain for the Serbia national beach soccer team. As a defender he could achieve his first goal at the 2016 Euro Beach Soccer League Division B game against Moldova.

Honours
Red Star
 Serbian SuperLiga (1): 2013–14

References

External sources
 
 Profile at Srbijafudbal

1982 births
Living people
People from Zemun
Footballers from Belgrade
Serbian footballers
Serbia and Montenegro under-21 international footballers
Serbian expatriate footballers
FK Zemun players
FK Železnik players
Red Star Belgrade footballers
Serbian SuperLiga players
Wisła Kraków players
Korona Kielce players
Ekstraklasa players
Expatriate footballers in Russia
Expatriate footballers in Poland
FC Khimki players
Russian Premier League players
Association football defenders
Serbian expatriate sportspeople in Poland
FC Amkar Perm players